Meurin may refer to:

 Pierre Meurin (born 1989), French politician
 Meurin Roman mine